The 1954 Aintree 200 was a Formula Libre race held on 29 May 1954. The race was held over two heats of 17 laps and a final of 34 laps. Reg Parnell won the first heat and Ron Flockhart the second, and Stirling Moss won the final in a Maserati 250F. Peter Collins set the fastest lap in the first heat and also fastest of the day in the final, with Roy Salvadori fastest in the second heat.

Results

Final

References

BARC Aintree 200
BARC Aintree 200